Boris Nikolayevich Streltsov (born 11 December 1943) is a Russian football coach and former player.

Playing career
Streltsov is from Kyrgyzstan. A forward, he started out his playing career in 1961 in FC Alga Bishkek. He retired in 1975 with FC Spartak Ivano-Frankivsk. During his playing career Streltsov also played for the football team of Kyrgyz SSR.

Coaching career
Streltsov is a Master of Sports of the Soviet Union and Merited Coach of Russia. 

In 1976, he became an assistant coach for Spartak. With the fall of the Soviet Union, Streltsov ended up in Ukraine coaching FC Kremin Kremenchuk, but later returned to Russia. The latest club that he coached was FC Kyrgyz-Ata out of Nookatsky District in 2016.

References

External links
 

1943 births
Living people
Sportspeople from Bishkek
Kyrgyzstani emigrants to Russia
Soviet footballers
Kyrgyzstani footballers
Association football forwards
FC Alga Bishkek players
FC Zorya Luhansk players
FC Spartak Ivano-Frankivsk players
FC Dnipro Cherkasy players
Soviet football managers
Russian football managers
FC Metallurg Lipetsk managers
FC Spartak Ivano-Frankivsk managers
FC Kryvbas Kryvyi Rih managers
FC Krystal Chortkiv managers
FC Kremin Kremenchuk managers
Ukrainian Premier League managers
Russian expatriate football managers
Russian expatriate sportspeople in Kyrgyzstan
Expatriate football managers in Kyrgyzstan
Russian expatriate sportspeople in Ukraine
Expatriate football managers in Ukraine